Penna Tervo (10 November 1901, Viipuri – 26 February 1956, Tuusula) was a Finnish politician. He served as Minister of Trade and Industry from 17 January 1951 to 8 July 1953 and again from 5 May to 20 October 1954. He also served as Minister of Finance from 20 October 1954 until his death on 26 February 1956. He was a member of the Parliament of Finland from 1945 until his death in 1956, representing the Social Democratic Party of Finland (SDP). He died in a car accident.

References

1901 births
1956 deaths
Politicians from Vyborg
People from Viipuri Province (Grand Duchy of Finland)
Social Democratic Party of Finland politicians
Ministers of Trade and Industry of Finland
Ministers of Finance of Finland
Members of the Parliament of Finland (1945–48)
Members of the Parliament of Finland (1948–51)
Members of the Parliament of Finland (1951–54)
Members of the Parliament of Finland (1954–58)
Finnish people of World War II
Road incident deaths in Finland